Smile.dk (sometimes written SMiLE.dk or Smile-dk, pronounced Smile D-K) or Smile is a Swedish Eurodance group with Veronica Almqvist as the only current member. The band is known for many songs featured in music video games, such as Dance Dance Revolution. They have regularly appeared on Dancemania since its tenth issue. Smile.dk has been one of the most featured acts in the Dancemania series, along with the likes of Captain Jack and E-Rotic.

History
Veronica Almqvist and Nina Boquist first formed as Smile, and released their first album Smile in 1998. It received significant attention in Japan. The first single from the album, "Butterfly", was licensed by Konami and featured in the first release of Dance Dance Revolution, a popular dance video game. The second single from the album, "Boys", pays homage to Sabrina Salerno's hit "Boys (Summertime Love)". The album was later re-released with new artwork and bonus tracks in Japan, where it was certified gold for 100,000 copies shipped to stores. 

After the release of Smile, Boquist left the band to start a solo career and was replaced by Malin Kernby. During this time, the band name was changed from Smile to Smile.dk, as they were being marketed in Denmark. They released two studio album under this line-up, Future Girls in 2000 and Golden Sky in 2002.

In 2005, according to their manager, Smile.dk had begun a hiatus due to both Almqvist and Kernby having become married; Kernby with a child on the way. However, he did not believe that Smile.dk would become defunct, which proved correct with their return, albeit without Kernby.

Return, line-up changes and Party Around the World

In early 2008, Smile.dk's producers Jamie Thompson (J-Mi/DJ Slash/MC Jay) and Dick Örnå (Mr. Dee) announced at the BubblegumDancer.com Forums that Smile.dk would be returning in 2008 with a worldwide single, "Doki Doki", and an album, Party Around the World. It was also announced that Kernby would be leaving the group, and Hanna Stockzell later joined. Then-new singer Stockzell performed in all of the songs on Party Around the World, except for "Doki Doki", which featured only Almqvist and Kernby, despite Kernby no longer being an active member.

Smile.dk (with Almqvist and Stockzell) performed live at San Japan, an anime convention located in San Antonio, Texas, on 9 August 2008. This was the first time they have ever performed in North America. They also performed live at Sakura-Con 2009 in Seattle, Washington on 10–12 April 2009.

Line-up changes, "Moshi Moshi" and pregnancy
In April 2010, it was announced that Stockzell would be leaving Smile.dk for personal reasons and to start a solo career under her real name Hanna Stockzell. It was also announced that Cecilia Reiskog would be joining as a member.

On 20 December 2011, they released their first single with the new line-up called "Moshi Moshi", which was delayed in some countries until May 2012 due to issues with its release. An animated music video for "Moshi Moshi" was uploaded to Smile.dk's official YouTube channel in early 2012. Later in 2012, they also confirmed that a song titled "Baby Boom" was being recorded, due to both Almqvist and Reiskog having become pregnant around the same time frame. While work for Smile.dk's new album continued, Smile.dk's progress slowed down so Almqvist and Reiskog could focus on their personal lives.

Reiskog's departure and Chinese tour
On 6 October 2013, Cecilia Reiskog announced on Smile.dk's official Facebook page that she would be leaving Smile.dk to focus on her personal life. Almqvist later confirmed that she had decided to continue Smile.dk by herself and would not be adding a new member.

In 2014, Almqvist confirmed that the group's next album was almost finished and that any songs featuring Reiskog would not be re-recorded and would be released as they are, making The Make-Up Collection Reiskog's first and only album with Smile.dk. She also confirmed on 10 March on the official Smile.dk fanpage that she was recording a different version of "Dragonfly" for the album.

As of 2015, Almqvist has confirmed that "The Make-Up Collection" is almost ready for release and that she would announce the release date when it is ready.

On August 14, 2015, Almqvist announced that Smile.dk would be going on tour in China from 30 October to 8 November. Later, on 25 October, she announced on Smile.dk's Facebook page that the Forever album would be released in early 2016. The Chinese tour was also moved to early 2016 to coincide with the album release.

On 26 November 2015, the single "Our Little Corner" was released worldwide on major digital music stores.

On 9 May 2016, J-Mi and former Smile.dk member Hannah Stockzell confirmed that their team had collaborated with Smile.dk for a remix EP release called Koko Soko 2016, due for release on 25 May.

On 28 September 2016, Almqvist posted 16 samples of tracks from the album Forever on Smile.dk's SoundCloud at smiledkmusic. The album contains eight new songs, five remakes and three remixes chosen as winners from the 2015 remix contest.

Discography

Albums
Smile (13 July 1998)
Future Girls (26 July 2000)
Golden Sky (4 December 2002)
Party Around the World (13 October 2008)
Forever (14 July 2017)

Compilations
Circuit Girl (2001)
X-Mas Party (2009)

EPs
Smile Paradise (31 January 2001)
Koko Soko 2016 (25 May 2016)

Singles
"Butterfly" (1998)
"Coconut" (1998) – No. 10 New Zealand
"Mr. Wonderful" (1999)
"Boys" (1999) – No. 28 Sweden
"Doo Be Di Boy" (2000)
"Dragonfly" (2001)
"Domo Domo Domo" (2002)
"Doki Doki" (2008)
"Moshi Moshi" (2011)
"Our Little Corner" (November 26, 2015)
"Koko Soko 2016" (2016)
"A Merry Christmas" (2016)
"Butterfly (Anniversary Edition)" (2018)

Music videos
Butterfly (1998)
Mr. Wonderful (1998)
Boys (1999)
Doo Be Di Boy (2000)
Domo Domo Domo (2002)
Moshi Moshi (2011)

Dancemania
10 (1998), X1 (1999), X5 (2000), X7 (2000), X8 (2001)
Delux : 3 (1999), 4 (2000)
Speed : 2 (1999), 3 (1999), Best 2001 (2000), 6 (2001)
Speed G : 1 (2003), 2 (2003)
Happy Paradise : 1 (2000), 2 (2001)
Best Red (2002)
Ex : 2 (2003), 4 (2003)
Hyper Delux (2003)
Treasure (2006)

Video games
Smile.DK has a total of 9 songs which appear in the Dance Dance Revolution (DDR) arcade series. "Butterfly" was featured in the first game and returned in numerous sequels, appearing in a total of 12 releases, the latest being a cover of the song in Dance Dance Revolution A20. Since Dance Dance Revolution X, "A Geisha's Dream" by Naoki featuring Smile.DK is a recurrent track in the DDR series. Of the 17 main arcade releases, only two omitted music from Smile.DK: DDRMAX and DDRMAX2.

References

External links
 Smile.dk Official website
 Smile.dk biography, news and discography at Bubblegum Dancer

Swedish Eurodance groups
Swedish girl groups
Swedish dance music groups
Video game musicians
English-language singers from Sweden
Musical groups established in 1998